The 1992 Penn State Nittany Lions football team represented the Pennsylvania State University in the 1992 NCAA Division I-A football season. The team was coached by Joe Paterno and played its home games in Beaver Stadium in University Park, Pennsylvania.

Schedule

Roster

NFL Draft
Eight Nittany Lions were drafted in the 1993 NFL Draft.

References

Penn State
Penn State Nittany Lions football seasons
Penn State Nittany Lions football